is a low-cost airline headquartered in Kozunomori, Narita, Japan. The airline began operations in August 2014, having originally planned to begin operations in autumn 2013. It is a subsidiary of Japan Airlines.

History
Spring Airlines announced in 2011 that it had plans to establish a subsidiary in Japan; it would be the first Chinese airline to do so. Spring was required to find one or more local partners due to Japanese legal restrictions that would limit its investment to a minority stake. When it launched, the airline was 33% owned by Spring Airlines, a Chinese low-cost carrier, with the remainder held by various Japanese investors. The airline is now majority-owned and controlled by Japan Airlines.

The airline received an air operator's certificate on 17 December 2013, having filed in September 2013 with 1.5 billion yen of equity capital, of which Spring Airlines invested 33%. The remainder of the airline's capital was provided by Japanese financial institutions, IT enterprises and trading companies, among others. There were plans to raise a further 4.5 billion yen of capital prior to commencement of operations. Japanese travel agency JTB announced in March 2014 that it would invest in Spring Airlines Japan and enter a partnership with the airline to provide Japan tour packages to Chinese customers.

Spring Airlines Japan planned to use primarily Japanese staff, such as retired Japan Airlines (JAL) pilots. Its head of operations, Minoru Uchida, was formerly a JAL pilot.

Destinations
The airline serves the following destinations:

Fleet

As of August 2019, Spring Airlines Japan fleet consists of the following aircraft:

The aircraft are fitted in a 189-seat configuration with 18 seats (the first three rows) curtained off as a premium cabin.

Spring Airlines Japan took delivery of its first aircraft, a Boeing 737-800, on 17 July 2013. Although Spring Airlines uses Airbus A320 aircraft, the 737 was chosen for its Japanese subsidiary due to the Boeing's greater popularity among Japanese airlines and the relative ease of finding 737-qualified pilots.

References

External links
 Website (Japanese)

Airlines of Japan
Airlines established in 2012
Companies based in Chiba Prefecture
Japanese companies established in 2012
Low-cost carriers
Multinational joint-venture companies